"The Big Thinker" is the twelfth episode of the second series of the 1960s cult British spy-fi television series The Avengers, starring Patrick Macnee and Honor Blackman. It was first broadcast by ABC on 15 December 1962. The episode was directed by Kim Mills and written by Martin Woodhouse.

Plot
A new cryogenic missile defence system computer, Plato, springs a deadly leak. Sabotage? Murder? Steed investigates while Cathy plays cards with sharks.

Cast
 Patrick Macnee as John Steed
 Honor Blackman as Cathy Gale 
 Antony Booth as Dr. James Kearns
 Walter Hudd as Dr. Clemens 
 David Garth as Dr. Farrow 
 Tenniel Evans as Dr. Hurst
 Allan McClelland as Nicky Broster
 Penelope Lee as Clarissa 
 Marina Martin as Janet Lingfield 
 Ray Browne as Blakelock
 Clive Baxter as Nino

References

External links

Episode overview on The Avengers Forever! website

The Avengers (season 2) episodes
1962 British television episodes